Wheelock Whitney may refer to one of three members of the Whitney family:

Wheelock Whitney, Sr. (1894–1957), or "Wheels" Whitney, businessman
Wheelock Whitney, Jr. (1926–2016), or "Whee" Whitney, businessman, politician, philanthropist, and sports team and racehorse owner
Wheelock Whitney III, or "Lock" Whitney, art historian, art dealer, author and philanthropist